Michal Kabelka (born 4 February 1985 in Lučenec) is a retired Slovak athlete. He competed at the 2012 Summer Olympics.

Competition record

References

External links

1985 births
Living people
People from Lučenec
Sportspeople from the Banská Bystrica Region
Slovak male high jumpers
Olympic athletes of Slovakia
Athletes (track and field) at the 2012 Summer Olympics
Competitors at the 2009 Summer Universiade